Catchpenny was an American rock/pop band. Tommy Stinson, Michael Bland, Phil Solem, Tommy Barbarella, John Fields, and Jim Anton also worked with Catchpenny.

The band set record attendance numbers at Hard Rock Cafe in Minneapolis, was featured on national television spots for ESPN and Arizona Jean Company, and sold more than 4000 copies of Chance for a Lifetime in its first year after release.

Their first album, Chance for a Lifetime, produced by Michael Bland, was recorded in eight days and released in December 2005.  Within a year, the band sold out of the album three times and watched their website traffic reach almost 100,000 hits. Catchpenny found themselves in opening slots for a long list of national acts.

Catchpenny performed for marines, soldiers, sailors, and airmen as part of their overseas tour during the summer of 2008. They performed at Al Taqaddum Air Base, Iraq on August 9, 2008 and at Ali Air Base/COB ADDER, Iraq on November 19, 2008. They returned to Iraq on April 8, 2009 to Joint Base Balad as part of their second tour entertaining troops.

Discography 
Albums
 Chance for a Lifetime (2005)
 From Where You Are (2008)

References 

Rock music groups from Minnesota